Mississauga—Erindale was a provincial electoral district in Ontario, Canada, that has been represented in the Legislative Assembly of Ontario since 2007.

It was created in 2003 from parts of Mississauga Centre and Mississauga West ridings.

It consisted of the part of the City of Mississauga bounded by a line drawn from the southwestern city limit northeast along Britannia Road West, southeast along Erin Mills Parkway, northeast along Eglinton Avenue West, southeast along Mavis Road, southwest along the Queensway West, west along the Credit River and southwest along Dundas Street West to the city limit.

In 2018, the district was dissolved into Mississauga—Erin Mills, Mississauga Centre and Mississauga—Lakeshore.

Members of Provincial Parliament

Election results

2007 electoral reform referendum

Sources

Elections Ontario Past Election Results

Former provincial electoral districts of Ontario
Politics of Mississauga